This article is about the particular significance of the year 1852 to Wales and its people.

Incumbents

Lord Lieutenant of Anglesey – Henry Paget, 1st Marquess of Anglesey 
Lord Lieutenant of Brecknockshire – John Lloyd Vaughan Watkins
Lord Lieutenant of Caernarvonshire – Sir Richard Williams-Bulkeley, 10th Baronet 
Lord Lieutenant of Cardiganshire – William Edward Powell
Lord Lieutenant of Carmarthenshire – George Rice, 3rd Baron Dynevor (until 9 April); John Campbell, 1st Earl Cawdor (from 4 May)
Lord Lieutenant of Denbighshire – Robert Myddelton Biddulph   
Lord Lieutenant of Flintshire – Sir Stephen Glynne, 9th Baronet
Lord Lieutenant of Glamorgan – Christopher Rice Mansel Talbot (from 4 May)
Lord Lieutenant of Merionethshire – Edward Lloyd-Mostyn, 2nd Baron Mostyn
Lord Lieutenant of Monmouthshire – Capel Hanbury Leigh
Lord Lieutenant of Montgomeryshire – Charles Hanbury-Tracy, 1st Baron Sudeley
Lord Lieutenant of Pembrokeshire – Sir John Owen, 1st Baronet
Lord Lieutenant of Radnorshire – John Walsh, 1st Baron Ormathwaite

Bishop of Bangor – Christopher Bethell 
Bishop of Llandaff – Alfred Ollivant 
Bishop of St Asaph – Thomas Vowler Short 
Bishop of St Davids – Connop Thirlwall

Events
24 February – The Times reports that Robert Stephenson has approved Isambard Kingdom Brunel's design for a railway bridge at Chepstow.
10 May – 27 men are killed by quicksand at Gwendraeth Colliery, Pontyberem.
14 May – 64 men are killed by underground explosion at Middle Duffryn Colliery, Aberdare.
August – Halkyn-born Mormon missionary Dan Jones begins his second (4-year) mission for the Church of Jesus Christ of Latter-day Saints in Wales. He also oversees translation of the Book of Mormon into the Welsh language.
14 September – Three-decker sailing first-rate ship of the line HMS Duke of Wellington, converted on the stocks to screw propulsion, is launched at Pembroke Dock.
4 November – In the United Kingdom general election:
Walter Coffin becomes the first Nonconformist MP elected in Wales.
Henry Vivian becomes MP for Truro.
Crawshay Bailey becomes MP for Monmouth Boroughs.
December – In the by-election caused by the death of John Josiah Guest, Henry Austin Bruce is elected MP for Merthyr Tydfil.
date unknown
St David's College, Lampeter, becomes the first institution in Wales to award degrees.
Construction of the first Merthyr Synagogue begins.
Richard Muspratt sets up an alkali manufacturing factory in Flint.
The Alliance Insurance Company is set up in Wrexham, advertising itself as the only Welsh insurance company.

Arts and literature

New books
Aneurin Jones – Tafol y Beirdd
William Rees (Gwilym Hiraethog) – Aelwyd F'Ewythr Robert
John Williams (Glanmor) – Awstralia a'r Cloddfeydd Aur
Robert Williams – Enwogion Cymru: A Biographical Dictionary of Eminent Welshmen, from the Earliest Times

Music
J. Ambrose Lloyd – Teyrnasoedd y Ddaear
Edward Stephen (Tanymarian) – Ystorm Tiberias (oratorio)
Thomas Williams (Hafrenydd) – Ceinion Cerddoriaeth

Births
20 March – John Gwenogvryn Evans, palaeographer (died 1930)
26 April – William Eilir Evans, journalist (died 1910)
28 April – Sir Francis Edwards, 1st Baronet, Liberal politician (died 1927)
25 November – Sir Evan Vincent Evans, Eisteddfod supporter (died 1934)
December – Alice Gray Jones (Ceridwen Peris), writer (died 1943)
date unknown
Ann Harriet Hughes (Gwyneth Vaughan), novelist (died 1910)
David Brynmor Jones, barrister, historian and Liberal MP (died 1921)

Deaths
23 February – Evan Jones (Ieuan Gwynedd), minister and journalist, 31
9 April – George Rice, 3rd Baron Dynevor, Lord Lieutenant of Carmarthenshire, 86
2 May – John Jones (Ioan Tegid), poet, 60
20 May – Robert Williamson ("Bardd Du Môn"), poet, 45?
17 June – John Page (Ioan Glan Dyfrdwy), poet, 21/22
26 November – John Josiah Guest, engineer, entrepreneur and politician, 77
18 December – Evan Owen Allen, writer, 47

References 

 
Wales